The Center for Advanced Biotechnology and Medicine (CABM) is located on Busch Campus in Piscataway, New Jersey. It was established in 1985 to advance knowledge in the life sciences for the improvement of human health. It is administered by Rutgers, The State University of New Jersey. The building was completed in 1990, and has  of lab and office space. It now is part of Rutgers Biomedical and Health Sciences campus that was created following the successful merger of UMDNJ.

Official Website
http://www3.cabm.rutgers.edu/home.php

Research institutes established in 1985
Rutgers University
University of Medicine and Dentistry of New Jersey
Biotechnology organizations
Medical research institutes in New Jersey
Buildings and structures in Middlesex County, New Jersey
1985 establishments in New Jersey